Zelyony Dol is a rural locality (a settlement) in Posyolok Mezinovsky, Gus-Khrustalny District, Vladimir Oblast, Russia. The population was 40 as of 2010.

Geography 
Zelyony Dol is located 18 km south of Gus-Khrustalny (the district's administrative centre) by road. Nechayevskaya is the nearest rural locality.

References 

Rural localities in Gus-Khrustalny District